Matti Pajari (born 17 March 1979) is a Finnish former racing cyclist. He won the Finnish national road race title in 2007.

References

External links

1979 births
Living people
Finnish male cyclists
Place of birth missing (living people)